In United States World War II military terminology, a torpedo aimed at a directly approaching boat was said to be aimed down the throat. This 0-degree bow angle (AOB) was usually used against attacking destroyers or anti-submarine craft.

A "down the throat" shot would be any shot in which the target craft, or simply put, it was heading straight toward the submarine.  These were extremely difficult setups from which to launch torpedoes, and usually it was only the skilled or desperate boat skippers who attempted such attacks. Further complications with the "down the throat" shot were the gyroscope issues that plagued US torpedoes, as well as the rapidly decreasing range of the target that could prevent arming of the torpedo.

It was first used by  under the command of Lieutenant Commander Lew Parks during the boat's first war patrol, although it did not hit.

Its first successful use was by Dudley W. Morton, while in command of the USS Wahoo (SS-238), according to the foreword written by Vice Admiral Charles A. Lockwood, Jr. in "Wake of the Wahoo", by Forrest Sterling.

During its last patrol,  sank an attacking Japanese destroyer with such a shot. Harders captain, Cdr. S.D. "Sam" Dealey, was awarded a posthumous Medal of Honor for the patrol.

References

Submarine tactics
 
Naval warfare tactics